Ambakum may refer to:
Ambakum, a literary form of the Russian first name Avvakum
Ambakum, Greek-based name of Book VIII in the Book of Twelve in the Bible